TwentyfourSeven was an Australian television series that first screened on SBS in 2002. The series revolves around the lives of the young editorial team who work in the office of an entertainment magazine called 'TwentyfourSeven'.

It was an interactive series that let viewers manipulate the direction of storylines. The series was written on a Monday, shot on a Tuesday and screened on a Wednesday.

The series was produced by Hal and Di McElroy, who also produced another interactive series on SBS called Going Home.

Cast
 Jenny Apostolou as Joanna Pappas, News and Features Editor
 John Atkinson as Nick Kaldor, Chief Sub-Editor
 Caroline Brazier as Georgia Leighton-Smith, Fashion and Style Editor
 David Callan Robert as James Fraser
 Hayley McElhinney as Ellie Moore, Editor's Assistant
 Josh Lawson as Tony White
 Rockell Williamson as Skye Hadley

See also 
 List of Australian television series

References

External links
 Australian Television Archive - TwentyfourSeven
 

Australian comedy television series
Australian drama television series
Special Broadcasting Service original programming
2002 Australian television series debuts
2002 Australian television series endings